Bani Hasan or alternative spellings (Arabic: بني حسن‎) may refer to:

Bani Hasan, Libya, a town in western Libya 
Beni Hasan, or Bani Hasan, an Ancient Egyptian cemetery site between Asyut and Memphis
Beni Ḥassān, a nomadic group of Arabian origin

See also
Hassan (disambiguation)
Mansheyat Bani Hasan, a Jordanian sports club
Qarawat Bani Hassan, a Palestinian town